The Canada men's national 3x3 team is the 3x3 basketball team representing Canada in international men's competitions.

The team competed at the 2021 FIBA 3x3 Olympic Qualifying Tournament hoping to qualify for the 2020 Summer Olympics in Tokyo, Japan. The team was eliminated in the preliminary round.

Competitions

3x3 World Cup

3x3 AmeriCup

References

Basketball in Canada
3
Men's national 3x3 basketball teams